The Verulam Formation is a geologic formation and Lagerstätte in Ontario, Canada. It preserves fossils dating back to the Katian stage of the Ordovician period, or Shermanian to Chatfieldian in the regional stratigraphy.

Description 
The Verulam Formation belongs to the Simcoe Group and overlies the Bobcaygeon Formation. Both the Bobcaygeon and Verulam Formations are composed of bioclastic wackestones, grainstones, and packstones interbedded with calcareous shales and siltstones. The Verulam contains more shale than the underlying Bobcaygeon Formation. Several hardgrounds have been documented in detail from the upper Bobcaygeon and lower Verulam. The paleoenvironments in which the Bobcaygeon and Verulam Formations were deposited have been interpreted as a proximal carbonate shelf that ranged in depth and proximity from shoal to shallow shelf in the Bobcaygeon and from deep shelf to shoal or shallow shelf in the Verulam Formation.

Fossil content 
The Verulam Formation and the underlying Bobcaygeon Formation have provided many fossils. Both formations form the Brechin Lagerstätte, a Lagerstätte of excellent preservation of numerous exceptionally preserved crinoid specimens with arms, stems, and attachment structures intact. Also ostracods, trilobites, bivalves, gastropods, cephalopods and other fossils were found in the formation.

Crinoids

 Glyptocrinus ramulosus
 Isotomocrinus tenuis
 Cleiocrinus regius
 Priscillacrinus elegans
 Abludoglyptocrinus steinheimerae
 Pararchaeocrinus kiddi
 Periglyptocrinus astricus
 Periglyptocrinus  kevinbretti
 Periglyptocrinus  mcdonaldi
 Periglyptocrinus  priscus
 Periglyptocrinus  silvosus
 Cupulocrinus jewetti
 Cupulocrinus humilis
 Praecupulocrinus conjugans
 Praecupulocrinus? sp.
 Iocrinus trentonensis
 Eustenocrinus springeri
 Cremacrinus guttenbergensis
 C. inaequalis
 Daedalocrinus bellevillensis
 Anomalocrinus astrictus
 Protaxocrinus laevis
 Plicodendrocrinus proboscidiatus
 Simcoecrinus mahalaki
 Dendrocrinus simcoensis
 Grenprisia billingsi
 Grenprisia springeri
 Illemocrinus amphiatus
 Porocrinus conicus
 Carabocrinus vancortlandti
 Carabocrinus radiatus
 Hybocrinus tumidus
 Hybocystites problematicus
 Konieckicrinus brechinensis
 K. josephi
 Reteocrinus alveolatus
 R. stellaris
 Archaeocrinus maraensis
 A. sundayae
Trilobites
 Encrinurus cybeleformis
 Erratencrinurus vigilans
 Flexicalymene senaria
 Isotelus gigas
 Ceraurinus marginatus
 Ceraurus pleurexanthemus
 cf. Achatella achates
 Bathyurus (Raymondites) ingalli
 Amphilichas sp.
 Bumastoides sp.
 Calyptaulax sp.
 Ceraurus sp.
 Encrinuroides sp.
 Flexicalymene sp.
 Hemiarges sp.
 Isotelus sp.
Edrioasteroidea
 Thresherodiscus ramosus
 Cryptogoleus chapmani
 Isorophusella sp.
Ostracods
 Thomasatia sp.
 Bassleratia sp.
 Eoleperditia sp.
Strophomenata
 Sowerbyella sp.
 Rafinesquina sp.
 Oepikina sp.
Rhynchonellata
 Anazyga sp.
 Zygospira sp.
 Rhynchotrema sp.
 Resserella sp.
 Dinorthis sp.
 Hesperorthis sp.
 Platystrophia sp.
 Plectorthis sp.
Bivalves
 Cyrtodonta subangulata
 Clionychia undata
 Plaesiomys subcircularis
 Ambonychia cf. orbicularis
 Ctenodonta cf. simulatrix
 Ambonychia sp.
 Ctenodonta sp.
 Nuculites sp.
 Tancrediopsis sp.
Gastropods
 Bucania halli
 Hormotoma gracilis
 Sinuites cancellatus
 Eotomaria dryope
 Alaskadiscus disculus
 Cyrtostropha salteri canadensis
 Fusispira elongata
 F. angusta
 Pterotheca sp.
 Liospira sp.
 Lophospira sp.
 Hormotoma sp.
 Subulites sp.
 Fusispira sp.
Cephalopods
 Endoceras cf. proteiforme
 Actinoceras sp.
 Endoceras sp.
Stenolaemata
 Mesotrypa angularis
 M. quebecensis
 M. whiteavesi
 Homotrypa minnesotensis
 Prasopora grandis
 P. insularis
 P. simulatrix
 Eridotrypa aedilis
 Pachydictya sp.
 Stictoporella sp.
 Hallopora sp.
 Mesotrypa sp.
 Prasopora sp.
 Rhinidictya sp.
 Batostoma sp.
 Hallopora multitabulata
Scyphozoa
 Climacoconus sp.
Rhombifera
 Glyptocystites sp.

Chlorophyceae
 Ischadites sp.

See also 
 List of fossiliferous stratigraphic units in Ontario
 Arnheim Formation, contemporaneous fossiliferous formation of Ohio
 San Benito Formation, contemporaneous fossiliferous formation of Bolivia
 Late Ordovician glaciation
 Ordovician meteor event
 Taconic orogeny

References

Bibliography 

  
 
 
 
 
 
 
 
 
 

 
Geologic formations of Ontario
Ordovician System of North America
Ordovician Ontario
Limestone formations
Deep marine deposits
Open marine deposits
Shallow marine deposits
Fossiliferous stratigraphic units of North America
Paleontology in Ontario